Robert Duncan (5 October 1850–1925) was a Conservative politician in Scotland.

Prior to his political career, Duncan worked for Ross & Duncan engineers and boilermakers. He and his wife Mary Ann Jolly (1865–1929) had one son, the physicist William Jolly Duncan, and two daughters.

Robert Duncan was elected to the House of Commons as Member of Parliament (MP) for Glasgow Govan at the 1906 general election, but was defeated at the January 1910 general election.

References

External links 
 

1850 births
1925 deaths
Members of the Parliament of the United Kingdom for Glasgow constituencies
Scottish Tory MPs (pre-1912)
UK MPs 1906–1910